Persbo is a locality situated in Ludvika Municipality, Dalarna County, Sweden with 344 inhabitants in 2010.

References 

Populated places in Dalarna County
Populated places in Ludvika Municipality